The 2013–14 curling season began in August 2013 and ended in May 2014.

Note: In events with two genders, the men's tournament winners will be listed before the women's tournament winners.

CCA-sanctioned events
This section lists events sanctioned by and/or conducted by the Canadian Curling Association (CCA). The following events in bold have been confirmed by the CCA as are part of the 2013–14 Season of Champions programme.

Other events
Note: Events that have not been placed on the CCA's list of sanctioned events are listed here. If an event is listed on the CCA's final list for the 2013–14 curling season, it will be moved up to the "CCA-sanctioned events" section.

World Curling Tour
Grand Slam events in bold.

Teams

Men's events

Women's events

WCT Order of Merit rankings

WCT Money List

The Dominion MA CupThe Dominion MA Cup (presented by TSN) was contested in the 2013–14 season. The Cup was awarded to the Canadian Curling Association Member Association (MA) who has had the most success during the season in CCA-sanctioned events. Events included the Canadian mixed championship, men's and women's juniors championships, the Scotties, the Brier, the men's and women's senior championships and the national wheelchair championship. Points were awarded based on placement in each of the events, with the top association receiving 14 points and each association under receiving points in decrements of one point.

StandingsFinal standings''

References

External links
World Curling Tour Home
Season of Champions Home
Curling Champions Tour Home
International bonspiel calendar

2013-14
2013-14
2013-14